Jared Hauser (born 1971), is an American oboist, recording artist, and educator. He is Associate Professor of oboe at Vanderbilt University Blair School of Music in Nashville, Tennessee, and also teaches at the National Music Festival in Chestertown, Maryland. Hauser plays with the Blair Woodwind Quintet, the contemporary music group Intersection, and as principal oboe with the Nashville Opera Orchestra. He also performs on period oboes with Early Music City, and Music City Baroque.

Recent features include performing for the 2020 RioWinds Festival, the Naxos of America Classical Music Day 2020, the Festival della Piana del Cavaliere Configni, and concerts at the Berlin Phiharmonie, the National Theater of Costa Rica, the Palacio de Congresos de Grandad Spain, the Chateau de la Rouche-Guyon France, as well as venues across North America.

History 
Born in Detroit, Michigan, and raised in nearby Southfield, Hauser is from a musical family, and began playing music at a young age, learning to read music before he read words. After experimenting with several instruments, he began playing oboe in the 7th grade, and studied privately with Robert Sorton, and later, Mark Dubois. After attending the Interlochen Arts Camp and the National High-School Music Institute at Northwestern University, Hauser became set on a career in music, and soon enrolled at the Interlochen Arts Academy where he studied with Daniel Stolper.

Hauser earned a Bachelor of Music degree from the University of Michigan School of Music, Theatre & Dance, an Artist's Diploma from the Oberlin Conservatory of Music, his Master of Music degree from the Rice University Shepherd School of Music, and finally a Doctor of Musical Arts from the Michigan State University College of Music, where his instructors were Harry Sargous, James Caldwell, Robert Atherholt, and Daniel Stolper respectively. He also studied with Neil Black, Alex Klein.

From 2002 to 2009 Hauser was principal oboist of the Orlando Philharmonic Orchestra and faculty at the Lynn Conservatory of Music. Other previous positions include teaching at the Interlochen Center for the Arts (Arts Camp 2005-2017, Arts Academy 2016/17), the Hot Springs Music Festival (2004-2010), and the Crane School of Music SUNY Potsdam (2001/02).

Hauser released his first solo recording, Temporal Fantasies of Britten and Hindemith, with Blue Griffin Recording in 2007. He remains a BGR Artist to this day, and has also recorded for Naxos, AMR, Warner Brothers Music, Koch International, Eroica, and AUR. His performances has been featured on CBC/Radio Canada, BBC Radio 3, and NPR’s Performance Today.

Hauser frequently appears as clinician, both nationally and internationally, on a variety of music-related subjects. In recent seasons he has presented over 60 masterclasses and clinics (both in-person and virtual) to students of all ages on topics such as oboe performance, reed making, chamber music, non-traditional repertoire and performance techniques, period performance practice, pedagogy, career development, and entrepreneurship.

Contemporary Music 
Hauser has actively engaged with composers in the creation of new works. Notable commissions and premiers include Song Without Words for Oboe and Piano (2020), and Avian Escapades (2016), both by Augusta Read Thomas; Pastorale by Lowell Liebermann; Monk's Oboe  for oboe and string quartet (2014) by Libby Larsen, the consortium premier of Crossroads (2014) by John Harbison; and A Year In The Catskills (2009) by Peter Schickele. Hauser has also premiered works by James Stevenson, Alexis Bacon, Gary Powell Nash, Wu Fei, Daniel Baldwin, John Steinmetz, Robert Patterson, Stan Link, Michael Rose, Michael Slayton, Dabney Morris, Stephen Lamb, David Sartor, David Lipten, Robert Brownlow, Joshua Burel, Elizabeth Hoffman, and Bill Douglas, among others.

Improvisation 
Hauser has spent the past several seasons developing skills as a multi-genre improvisor in an attempt to push the boundaries of the oboe’s traditional catalog, and expand his own repertoire beyond the classical realm. Recent performances have included works involving interactive electronic media with improvised oboe, art-music involving improvisation, and performance in genres outside of the classical realm such as jazz, and music of the world. He has studied improvisation with multi-genre saxophonist, Jeff Coffin, and with jazz bassoonist Paul Hanson.

In 2019 Hauser premiered Bogha Baisti, for Improvised Oboe and Soundtrack, by Elizabeth Hoffman, and is working with composer, and Vanderbilt colleague, Stan Link to create a new work for improvised oboe and "live" electronics.

Discography

As soloist 

 Past Perfect: Concertos by Pla, Telemann, Albinoni and Bach, (2019) BGR 525
 With All String Attached  (2018) BGR 445
 Bach  (2106) BGR 389
 Into A Cloud (2014) BGR 313
 Operatic Oboe (2010) BGR167            
 Temporal Fantasies of Britten and Hindemith (2007) BGR141

As Chamber Music 

 Reinecke, Rose and Damase: Trios for Oboe, Horn and Piano, (2012) BGR 249, with the Mirabelle Trio
 American Classics: Peter Schickele, A Year in the Catskills (2011) Naxos 8.559687, with the Blair Woodwind Quintet
 Heitor Villa-Lobos, Sexteto Mistico and Other Chamber Music (2011) Naxos 9.70127

As Ensemble Performer 

 Three Way, A Trio of One Act Operas (2017) AMR1048, Nashville Opera
 Jazz Nocturne - American Concertos of the Jazz Age: (2011) Naxos 8.559647, Hot Springs Music Festival
 Gottschalk (2007) Naxos 8.559320, Hot Springs Music Festival
 Expressions of Music: Expressions of Music Curriculum, Warner Brothers Music
 Gemini and the Phoenix Ensemble: (2000) Gemini        
 Signs of Intelligent Life: (2006) Eroica Classics JDT3301  
 America’s Millennium Tribute to Adolphe Sax, Volume VII: (2004) Arizona University Recordings AUR CD3128

                                               

                                  

1971 births
Living people
Vanderbilt University faculty
American classical oboists
Male oboists
University of Michigan School of Music, Theatre & Dance alumni